Jeffrey Harris may refer to:

Jeffrey Harris (artist) (born 1949), New Zealand artist
Jeffrey E. Harris, American physician and economist 
Jeffrey K. Harris (born 1953), American director of the National Reconnaissance Office

See also
Jeff Harris (disambiguation)